John Dicks (born 23 July 1947) is an English stage, film and television actor. His stage work includes appearances with the RSC, and in Andrew Lloyd Webber's flop musical Jeeves in London, 1975, in which he also sang on the rare recording.
His film appearances include The Empire Strikes Back (1980), The First Kangaroos (1988), Flirting (1991), Return to the Blue Lagoon (1991) and Queen of the Damned (2002).

Filmography

References

External links
 

English male stage actors
English male film actors
English male television actors
1947 births
Living people